Sha Tin Sewage Treatment Works is a sewage treatment facility in Hong Kong. It is located in Ma Liu Shui, Sha Tin, along the Shing Mun River, at its mouth into Sha Tin Hoi (Tide Cove).

The treatment works serves Sha Tin, Ma On Shan and the villages nearby. The plant is managed by the Drainage Services Department.

It was then extended in several stages. Stage I was first commissioned in 1982 with stage II following in 1986. Stage III was completed in September 2004.

Construction work to move the sewage treatment facility to an artificial cave within Nui Po Shan, a nearby mountain, started in 2021.

References

External links

 Drainage Services Department website
 Sha Tin Sewage Treatment Works, Stage III Environmental Impact Assessment Study

Water supply and sanitation in Hong Kong
Waste management in Hong Kong
Ma Liu Shui